Ronald Clyde Gardenhire (born October 24, 1957) is an American former professional baseball player, coach, and manager. He played as a shortstop for the New York Mets from 1981 through 1985. After another year playing in the minor leagues, he served as a manager in the Minnesota Twins farm system for three years, then as a coach for the Twins from 1991 through 2001, and then as the Twins' manager from 2002 through 2014, winning the American League Manager of the Year Award in 2010. He then coached for the Arizona Diamondbacks in 2017 and managed the Detroit Tigers from 2018 through most of 2020, when he retired from baseball.

Early life
Ron Gardenhire was born to a military family at the U.S. Army base in Butzbach, West Germany. While growing up, he expected to join the military, but his passion for baseball was also encouraged by his father.  The family later settled in Oklahoma where he attended Okmulgee High School and college at the University of Texas at Austin.

Playing career
The New York Mets drafted Gardenhire in the sixth round of the 1979 amateur draft. He played for the Mets for five seasons, from 1981 to 1985. During his playing career, Gardenhire played shortstop, second base, and third base. He was plagued by injuries, especially to his hamstring. Only twice did he play in more than 70 games in a season, in 1982 and 1984. Following the 1986 season he was traded to the Minnesota Twins, where he played one season for their Triple-A affiliate before retiring as a player.

Gardenhire stood six feet (183 cm) tall, and weighed 175 (79 kg) pounds during most of his baseball playing career.

Managerial career

Minor leagues
For three years after he retired as a player (1988–90), Gardenhire was a manager in the Minnesota farm system, leading teams in the Class A Midwest League and Class AA Southern League to one second- and two first-place finishes.

Minnesota Twins
On January 4, 2002, Gardenhire was named manager of the Twins, replacing Tom Kelly, who had won two World Series titles with the Twins. In contrast to Kelly's relatively calm, Bud Grant-like coaching style, Gardenhire was a very active and aggressive manager, frequently exiting the dugout to argue with umpires, leading some to joke that "Gardy" got ejected more times in a season than Kelly did in his entire career. In his 13 seasons managing the Twins, Gardenhire was ejected 73 times. An early 2006 television commercial for the Twins pokes fun at this, showing Gardenhire arguing with an office worker planning to go home after work rather than go to the Twins game.

Heading into Gardenhire's first season as team manager, the Twins had not been to the postseason since their World Series championship in 1991, and had barely escaped being dissolved entirely by a contraction plan that was aborted by a court ruling which binded the team to their lease with the Metrodome. Under Gardenhire, the Twins had a turnaround season in 2002 as they won the American League Central division and made it to the 2002 American League Championship Series.

In thirteen seasons as the Twins' manager, Gardenhire's team had a losing record five times (2007, 2011, 2012, 2013 and 2014), and won the division six times (the Twins lost a one-game playoff to the Chicago White Sox to determine the division champion at the end of the 2008 season). Despite all of the team's regular season success under Gardenhire, the Twins advanced to the American League Championship Series only once – his first season, in 2002 – and did not reach the World Series. In Gardenhire's tenure as the manager of the Twins, the team posted a playoff record of 6 wins and 21 losses. He was the first manager in major league history to take a team to the playoffs six times in a tenure and never make it to the World Series (Bob Melvin joined him in 2020), and he is one of just five managers with at least four playoff appearances to never appear in one.

Gardenhire won the American League Manager of the Year Award in 2010 and finished as runner-up for the award in 2003, 2004, 2006, 2008, and 2009 while leading the Twins. He finished third in the voting in 2002, his first season as manager. Gardenhire's five runner-up finishes are tied with Tony La Russa, who won the award outright an additional four times. In 2009, he received the Chuck Tanner Major League Baseball Manager of the Year Award.

On November 13, 2008, Gardenhire signed a contract extension that kept him as the Twins' manager through the 2011 season. On November 18, 2010, the Twins announced a two-year contract extension through 2013. In October 2012, after two consecutive 90 plus loss seasons, Gardenhire was not given a contract extension past the 2013 season. On September 30, 2013, despite having another 90 plus loss season for the third year in a row, Gardenhire was given a two-year extension, through 2015. He had 998 career wins at the end of the 2013 season.

Gardenhire earned his 1,000th managerial victory on April 5, 2014 with a 7-3 victory over the Cleveland Indians at Progressive Field. He became the 60th manager in major league history to top one thousand wins. Gardenhire is only the tenth manager to accomplish this feat with only one team, joining the Twins' previous manager, Tom Kelly, on that list.

On September 29, 2014, Gardenhire was fired after 13 seasons as Twins manager and 27 years in the Twins organization. The last four years of Gardenhire's tenure were the worst in Twins' history. This included 383 losses and a record of 78-148 from August 1 to the end of the season. His overall regular season record was 1,068–1,039 and his playoff record was 6–21.

Gardenhire was inducted into the Twins Hall of Fame in 2022.

Detroit Tigers
On October 20, 2017, it was announced that Gardenhire had signed a three-year contract to take the helm of the Detroit Tigers beginning in the 2018 season. He succeeded Brad Ausmus, who posted a 314–332 record in four seasons.

In his first game as the Tigers' manager, Gardenhire was ejected after what initially appeared to be a walk-off win in the 10th inning over the Pittsburgh Pirates was overturned on video review. The Tigers lost the game to the Pirates, 13-10, in 13 innings.

On September 19, 2020, Gardenhire announced his retirement as a manager due to health concerns.

Managerial record

Coaching career

In 1991, Gardenhire became the Twins' third base coach and held that post for 11 full seasons, including the team's 1991 World Series championship.

Gardenhire began the 2017 season as the bench coach of the Arizona Diamondbacks.  However, after the first seven games of the season, he left the team on a leave of absence for prostate cancer surgery. He was replaced by Jerry Narron, who took over as interim bench coach. After a five-week absence, Gardenhire rejoined the Diamondbacks in May.

Personal life

Gardenhire is married to Carol (née Kissling). The Gardenhires have three children: son Toby, and daughters Tiffany and Tara.

Toby Gardenhire was drafted by the Minnesota Twins in the 41st round of the 2005 MLB Draft, spent most of his time as a utility player, and rose as high as the AAA Rochester Red Wings, before retiring as a player. Like his father, Toby was known more for his glove than his bat. After hitting .247 in 103 games at Rochester in 2011, Toby posted a career line of .232/.291/.274 with six home runs in 533 minor league games while seeing playing time at all nine defensive positions including  innings as a pitcher.

After a stint as the head coach for the University of Wisconsin-Stout baseball team Toby Gardenhire joined the Twins system, first with the Cedar Rapids Kernels in the Twins farm system. Since 2021, Toby has managed the Twins' AAA-affiliate St. Paul Saints.

See also

List of Major League Baseball managers by wins
List of Major League Baseball players from Europe

References

External links

Ron Gardenhire at Ultimate Mets Database
Retrosheet
Venezuelan Professional Baseball League
Gardenhire bio at the Detroit Tigers' official website

1957 births
Living people
American expatriates in West Germany
Arizona Diamondbacks coaches
Baseball coaches from Oklahoma
Baseball players from Oklahoma
Detroit Tigers managers
Jackson Mets players
Leones del Caracas players
American expatriate baseball players in Venezuela
Lynchburg Mets players
Major League Baseball bench coaches
Major League Baseball players from Germany
Major League Baseball shortstops
Major League Baseball third base coaches
Manager of the Year Award winners
Minnesota Twins coaches
Minnesota Twins managers
Minor league baseball managers
New York Mets players
Paris Dragons baseball players
People from Butzbach
Sportspeople from Darmstadt (region)
Portland Beavers players
Texas Longhorns baseball players
Tidewater Tides players